Colin Fleming and Scott Lipsky were the defending champions but decided not to participate.
Andre Begemann and Jordan Kerr won the title 6–2, 6–3 Gerard Granollers and Alexandros Jakupovic against.

Seeds

Draw

Draw

References
 Main Draw

Status Athens Open - Doubles
2012 Doubles